Alberto Berasategui was the defending champion, but retired during his first round match against Albert Costa.

Marc Rosset won the title by defeating Yevgeny Kafelnikov 6–4, 6–0 in the final.

Seeds

Draw

Finals

Top half

Bottom half

References

External links
 Official results archive (ATP)
 Official results archive (ITF)

Nice